Dopachrome is a cyclization product of L-DOPA and is an intermediate in the biosynthesis of melanin. It may tautomerise to form DHICA.

See also 
 Dopachrome tautomerase, a human gene

References 

Indolequinones